Juan Andrade (1898–1981) was a Spanish politician.

Juan Andrade may also refer to:

Juan Pablo Andrade (born 1988), Chilean footballer
Juan Andrade (karateka), participated in Karate at the 2010 Central American and Caribbean Games
Juan Andrade (triathlete) in Triathlon at the 2015 Pan American Games – Men's

See also
Juan Andrade Heymann (born 1945), Ecuadorian writer